Tellervini is a tribe of danaid butterflies with only the one genus Tellervo, with six widely distributed species found in the Australasian realm and the Indomalayan realm (also called the Oriental region). The taxon is apparently monophyletic, but its relationship with the other two danaid tribes is yet uncertain. The phylogeography of the group is also a challenge to those who hold to a Cenozoic origin of the butterflies.

Genus, species, and subspecies of Tellervini 

 Source: The higher classification of Nymphalidae, at Nymphalidae.net
 Note: Names preceded by an equal sign (=) are synonyms, homonyms, rejected names or invalid names.

Subfamily Danainae Boisduval, 1833

Tribe Tellervini Fruhstorfer, 1910
 Tellervo Kirby, 1894 (= Hamadryas Boisduval, 1832 (nec Hübner, 1806))
 Tellervo jurriaansei Joicey & Talbot, 1922
 Tellervo nedusia (Geyer, 1832) (= original name Stalachtis nedusia Geyer, 1832; = Hamadryas nedusia (Geyer, 1832))
 Tellervo nedusia nedusia (Geyer, 1832) (= Tellervo zoilus f. incisa Strand, 1911)
 Tellervo nedusia fallax (Staudinger, 1885) (= original name Hamadryas assarica f. fallax Staudinger, 1885)
 Tellervo nedusia coalescens Rothschild, 1915 (= Tellervo fallax exilis Hulstaert, 1931)
 Tellervo nedusia biakensis Joicey & Talbot, 1916
 Tellervo nedusia meforicus Fruhstorfer, 1911 (= Tellervo zoilus roonensis Fruhstorfer, 1911)
 Tellervo nedusia mysoriensis (Staudinger, 1885) (= original name Hamadryas zoilus f. mysoriensis Staudinger, 1885)
 Tellervo nedusia jobia Ackery, 1987
 Tellervo nedusia wollastoni Rothschild, 1916 (= Tellervo assarica adriaansei Hulstaert, 1923)
 Tellervo nedusia papuensis Ackery, 1987
 Tellervo nedusia huona Ackery, 1987
 Tellervo nedusia wangaarica Ackery, 1987
 Tellervo nedusia talasea Ackery, 1987
 Tellervo nedusia aruensis Joicey & Talbot, 1922
 Tellervo hiero (Godman & Salvin, 1888) (= original name Hamadryas hiero Godman & Salvin, 1888)
 Tellervo hiero hiero (Godman & Salvin, 1888) (= Hamadryas salomonis Ribbe, 1898)
 Tellervo hiero evages (Godman & Salvin, 1888)
 Tellervo parvipuncta Joicey & Talbot, 1922
 Tellervo parvipuncta parvipuncta Joicey & Talbot, 1922
 Tellervo parvipuncta separata Ackery, 1987
 Tellervo zoilus (Fabricius, 1775) (= original name Papilio zoilus Fabricius, 1775)
 Tellervo zoilus zoilus (Fabricius, 1775)
 Tellervo zoilus niveipicta (Butler, 1884) (= Tellervo zoilus vereja Fruhstorfer, 1911)
 Tellervo zoilus nais (Guérin-Méneville, 1830) (= original name Nymphalis nais Guérin-Méneville, 1830)
 Tellervo zoilus distincta Rothschild, 1915
 Tellervo zoilus digulica Hulstaert, 1924 (= Tellervo zoilus arctifascia Hulstaert, 1924)
 Tellervo zoilus zephoris Fruhstorfer, 1911
 Tellervo zoilus antipatrus Fruhstorfer, 1911 (= Tellervo zoilus pantaenus Fruhstorfer, 1916)
 Tellervo zoilus sarcapus Fruhstorfer, 1911
 Tellervo zoilus mujua Ackery, 1987
 Tellervo zoilus misima Ackery, 1987
 Tellervo zoilus tagula Ackery, 1987
 Tellervo zoilus duba Ackery, 1987
 Tellervo zoilus gelo Waterhouse & Lyell, 1914
 Tellervo zoilus aequicinctus (Salvin & Godman, 1877) (= original name Hamadryas aequicinctus Salvin & Godman, 1877; = Hamadryas aequicinctus var. variegatus Ribbe, 1898)
 Tellervo zoilus lavonga Ackery, 1987
 Tellervo assarica (Stoll, 1781) (= original name Papilio assarica Stoll, 1781; = Aeria assarica (Stoll, 1781); = Heliconia assarica (Stoll, 1781); = Hamadryas assarica (Stoll, 1781))
 Tellervo assarica assarica (Stoll, 1781)
 Tellervo assarica boeroeensis Jurriaanse & Volbeda, 1922
 Tellervo assarica seramica Ackery, 1987
 Tellervo assarica mysolensis Joicey & Talbot, 1922
 Tellervo assarica gebiensis Ackery, 1987
 Tellervo assarica macrofallax Strand, 1911 (= Tellervo assarica waigeuensis Joicey & Talbot, 1922)
 Tellervo assarica salawatica Ackery, 1987
 Tellervo assarica mioswara Ackery, 1987
 Tellervo assarica jobinus Fruhstorfer, 1911 (= Tellervo zoilus mysoriensis f. kordonis Strand, 1911)
 Tellervo assarica limetanus Fruhstorfer, 1911 (= Tellervo zoilus sedunia Strand, 1911)
 Tellervo assarica strandi Ackery, 1987
 Tellervo assarica talboti Ackery, 1987
 Tellervo assarica hiempsal Fruhstorfer, 1910

References 

 Ackery, P. R. 1987. The danaid genus Tellervo (Lepidoptera, Nymphalidae) - a cladistic approach. Zoological Journal of the Linnean Society 89: 203-247.

External links 

 Tellervini on Tree of Life website

External links
Tellervo at Markku Savela's Lepidoptera and Some Other Life Forms

-
Monotypic Lepidoptera taxa
Monotypic insect tribes
Butterfly tribes